Ragnhild Westgaard (born 13 November 1976), or often referred to as Nell Sigland, is a Norwegian singer from Hamar, best known as the lead vocalist of Norwegian gothic metal band Theatre of Tragedy from 2004 to 2010. She was also the lead singer for Norwegian gothic rock band The Crest for ten years, from 1996 until the end of 2005, founded by her then-husband Kristian Sigland and herself.

Discography

The Crest 
Demos:
 Straightjacket Singalongs (1998)
 Childhood's End/Thorn (1999)
 Thunderfuel (1999)
 Dark Rock Armada (2000)	

Albums:
 Letters from Fire (2002)
 Vain City Chronicles (2005)

Theatre of Tragedy 
Albums:
 Storm (2006)
 Forever Is the World (2009)

Singles:
 Storm (2006)
 Deadland (2009)

EPs:
 Addenda (2010)

DVDs:
 Last Curtain Call (2011) (also live album)

Guest appearances
 Gothminister – Gothic Electronic Anthems (2003) – vocals in the songs "Hatred" and "Wish"
 Gothminister – Happiness in Darkness (2008) – vocals in the songs "Your Saviour", "The Allmighty" and "Emperor"
 Dark Tranquillity – Fiction (2007) – co-vocals on "The Mundane and the Magic"
 Dark Tranquillity – Where Death Is Most Alive DVD (2009) – co-vocals on "The Mundane and the Magic" and "Insanity's Crescendo"
 Alight – Don't Fear the Revenge (2009) – vocals in the song "Your Bride"

References

External links
 Nell Sigland – profile at official Theatre of Tragedy website

1976 births
Women heavy metal singers
Living people
Norwegian women singers
Norwegian heavy metal singers
Norwegian sopranos
Musicians from Hamar
Theatre of Tragedy members